The 6th Edda Awards were held on 14 November 2004 at Nordica Hótel in Reykjavik. The awards were hosted by actress/comedian Helga Braga Jónsdóttir and TV presenter Kristján Kristjánsson.

For the first time only one award was given for Best Actor and Actress as well as the Supporting Actor and Actress.

As in previous years the public was able to cast their votes online. The Icelandic Film and Television Academy had 70% say in the results and the public 30%. Except for the Best Television Personality where the public had 100% say in the results.

The film Kaldaljós, directed by Hilmar Oddson, was the winner of the evening taking five awards and receiving eight nominations. The Best Documentary category was interesting this year since two of the nominated films, Án Titils and Faux - í þessu máli, were about a high profile fraud case, where a great deal of paintings from Icelandic artists had been faked and sold. The goal was to make the court system change the laws on fraud of that kind since the laws were outdated and unclear.

Ingvar E. Sigurðsson and Ómar Ragnarsson both won their third Eddas on the night. Sigurðsson his third Best Actor award and Ragnarsson the award for Best Television Personality. He had previously won an award for Best News Anchor in 2001 and 2003.

Returning Categories 
 Edda Award for Best Television Program (staged)

Discontinued Categories 
 Edda Award For Best News Anchor

New Categories 
 Edda Award for Best Entertainment in Television

Results 
The nominees and winners were: (Winners highlighted in bold)

Best Film
 Dís, directed by Silja Hauksdóttir
 Kaldaljós, directed by Hilmar Oddsson
 Næsland, directed by eftir Friðrik Þór Friðriksson
Best Director
 Erla B. Skúladóttir, for Bjargvætturinn
 Hilmar Oddsson, for Kaldaljós
 Þorfinnur Guðnason, for Hestasaga
Best Actor/Actress
 Áslákur Ingvarsson, for Kaldaljós
 Brynja Þóra Guðnadóttir, for Salt
 Ingvar E. Sigurðsson, for Kaldaljós
 Jón Sigurbjörnsson, for Síðasti Bærinn
 Þröstur Leó Gunnarsson, for Vín Hússins
Best Supporting Actor/Actress
 Helga Braga Jónsdóttir, for Kaldaljós
 Ilmur Kristjánsdóttir, for Dís
 Kristbjörg Kjeld, for Kaldaljós
 Snæfríður Ingvarsdóttir, for Kaldaljós
 Þórunn Clausen, for Dís
Best Screenplay
 Huldar Breiðfjörð, for Næsland
 Jón Gnarr, for Með Mann á Bakinu
 Magnús Magnússon, for World of Solitude
Best Sound or Cinematography
 Steingrímur Þórðarson, for editing Sjálfstætt Fólk
 Sigurður Sverrir Pálsson, for cinematography in Kaldaljós
 Þorsteinn J. Vilhjálmsson, for overall presentation on the film Án Titils
Best Visual Design
 Helga Rós Hannam, for costuming in Svínasúpan
 Haukur Hauksson, for overall presentation Í Brennidepli
 Úlfur Karlsson, for set design in Anna Afastelpa
Best Documentary
 Blindsker, directed by Ólafur Jóhannesson
 Faux – Í þessu máli, directed by Sólveig Anspach
 Hestasaga, directed by Þorfinnur Guðnason
 Love is in the air, directed by Ragnar Bragason
 World of solitude, directed by Páll Steingrímsson
Best Short
 Bjargvættur, directed by Erla B. Skúladóttir
 Móðan, directed by Jón Karl Helgason
 Síðustu orð Hreggviðs, directed by Grímur Hákonarson
 '''Síðasti Bærinn, directed by Rúnar Rúnarsson
 Vín Hússins, directed by Örn Marinó Arnarson and Þorkel Harðarson
Best Television Program (staged)
 And Björk of Course, directed by Lárus Ýmir Óskarsson
 Mynd Fyrir Afa, directed by Tinna Gunnlaugsdóttir
 Njálssaga, directed by Björn Brynjúlfur Björnsson
Best Television Program
 Sjálfstætt Fólk – Stöð 2
 Í brennidepli – RÚV
 Fólk með Sirrý – Skjár 1
Best Entertainment in Television
 Idol-stjörnuleit – Stöð 2
 Spaugstofan – RÚV
 Svínasúpan – Stöð 2
Best Television Personality
 Ómar Ragnarsson - RÚV
Best Music Video
 Dúkkulísur - Sögustelpan, directed by Gunnar B. Guðmundsson og Stefán Benedikt Vilhelmsson
 Bang Gang - Stop in the Name of Love, directed by Ragnar Bragason
 María Mena - Just a Little Bit, directed by Ragnar Agnarsson
Honorary Award
 Páll Steingrímsson, film director, for a long and successful carrier in documentary film making, with focus on nature.

External links 
 Edda Awards official website
 Edda Awards 2004 Photo Gallery at mbl.is

References 

Edda Awards
2004 film awards